Marit Eikemo (born 1971) is a Norwegian essayist, novelist, journalist and magazine editor.

Eikemo was born in Odda. She edited the book Her, no: Møte med unge menneske in 1999, and contributed to the essay collection Synd.no from 2001. Her first novel was Mellom oss sagt from 2006. In 2008 she published the essay collection Samtidsruinar, and in 2009 the novel Arbeid pågår. She was awarded the Nynorsk Literature Prize for the novel Samtale ventar in 2011.

Eikemo was co-editor of the cultural and political magazine Syn og Segn from 2003 to 2006, jointly with Hilde Sandvik.

References

1971 births
Living people
People from Odda
Norwegian women novelists
Norwegian essayists
Norwegian magazine editors
21st-century Norwegian novelists
21st-century Norwegian women writers
Women magazine editors